Ian Graham (born 12 February 1967) is a former professional snooker player.

Graham reached the final stages of the 1991 World Snooker Championship losing 3–10 to eventual semi-finalist, Steve James.

In 1989, he reached the quarter-final of the Hong Kong Open, and in 1991, the quarter-final of the Grand Prix.

References

 

English snooker players
Living people
1967 births